Tuanku Sir Muhammad Shah ibni Almarhum Tuanku Antah  (25 April 1865 – 1 August 1933) was the seventh Yamtuan Besar of Seri Menanti, who ruled from 1888 to 1933. During his reign, Negeri Sembilan came under British protection in 1889 and became a Federated Malay State in 1895. 

In June 1887, he was declared as Yam Tuan as recognised by British Authority. Sir Tuanku Muhammad Shah re-established the traditional constitution with the four Undang (Lawgivers) and, on 29 April 1898, he was duly elected by the four Undang as Yang-di-Pertuan Besar; the first election under the modern re-constituted Negeri Sembilan. He was installed on 7 May 1898  at Seri Menanti.

After a reign of 45 years, in 1933, he died at the age of 68 years. He was buried at the Seri Menanti Royal Mausoleum at Seri Menanti.

He is regarded as The Father of Negeri Sembilan modernisation. After his death, an English school in Kuala Pilah (Tuanku Muhammad School) was renamed after him in his honour. 

He was the only King of Negeri Sembilan to have received the title 'Sir' from Queen Victoria. He was also the longest-serving monarch of Negeri Sembilan in the state's history. Tuanku Muhammad was also the only King of Negeri Sembilan to be involved in Durbar (Conference of Rulers) of Malay Federated States, with Sultan Idris of Perak, Sultan Abdul Samad of Selangor & Sultan Ahmad of Pahang. He is one of the founders of Malaysia's first institutional college, The Malay College Kuala Kangsar. His great-grandson, Tuanku Ja'afar would go on to study there as a teenager.

Tuanku Muhammad oversaw the building of both the Istana Lama Seri Menanti (presently the Royal Museum of Seri Menanti), and the Istana Besar Seri Menanti.

Honours
 :
 Honorary Companion of the Order of St Michael and St George (CMG) (1 January 1894)
 Honorary Knight Commander of the Order of St Michael and St George (KCMG) - Sir (3 June 1916)
 Knight Commander of the Royal Victorian Order (KCVO) - Sir (10 July 1925)
 Honorary Knight Grand Cross of the Order of St Michael and St George (GCMG) - Sir (1 January 1931)

Gallery

References 

Yang di-Pertuan Besar of Negeri Sembilan
Founding monarchs
1865 births
1933 deaths
Royal House of Negeri Sembilan
People from British Malaya
Knights Grand Cross of the Order of St Michael and St George
Knights Commander of the Royal Victorian Order
19th-century monarchs in Asia
20th-century Malaysian politicians